The Decor-1 factory railway is in the Nizhny Novgorod Oblast, Russia. The railway is used for the transportation of gypsum from the mine to the «Dekor-1» factory.

Current status 
Peshelan gypsum factory «Dekor-1» located near the town of Arzamas, Nizhny Novgorod Oblast. In 1946 a  gypsum mine was opened in the village of Bebyayevo. Ten trains run on the railway each day.

Rolling stock

Locomotives 
 TU6A – № 1473, 2574
 TU8 – № 0340, 0342
 Traction rolling stock in the mine – electric

Railroad car 
 Snow blower
 Minecart for transportation of gypsum

Gallery

See also
Narrow-gauge railways in Russia
Altsevo peat narrow-gauge railway
Kerzhenets peat narrow-gauge railway
Pizhemskaya narrow gauge railway

References and sources

External links

 Official Website 
 Mining Museum 
 Photo - project «Steam Engine» 
 «The site of the railroad» S. Bolashenko 
 Narrow-gauge railway of Decor-1 factory (interactive map) 

750 mm gauge railways in Russia
Rail transport in Nizhny Novgorod Oblast